Robert A. Butkin is an American law professor, academic administrator and politician who served as State Treasurer of Oklahoma from 1995 to 2005. Butkin subsequently served as dean of the University of Tulsa College of Law from 2005 until 2007.

Background and career
Butkin is currently a tenured professor at the University of Tulsa College of Law. Butkin drafted legislation that created Oklahoma's College Savings Plan, and co-chairing the effort to pass two state constitutional amendments that now allow public Oklahoma universities to engage in technology-transfer and commercial development of their own ideas. He also co-chaired the successful effort that created a permanent constitutional trust fund for tobacco-settlement monies. Dean Butkin chaired Governor-elect Brad Henry's transition team, recruiting a bi-partisan group of business, civic and political leaders who assisted the governor in identifying key issues. He has served in various organizations including holding the presidency of the Southern State Treasurers Association. He chaired the Banking, Collateral and Cash Management Committee for the National Association of State Treasurers.

Butkin received a Bachelor of Arts degree from Yale College in Connecticut, graduating magna cum laude in 1975 with distinction in history. He received his Juris Doctor from the University of Pennsylvania Law School in Philadelphia in 1978. He was one of 15 Americans named a Henry Luce Scholar in 1978 and served as visiting fellow at the University of the Philippines Law Center in Quezon City. He also held the position of assistant attorney general for the state of Oklahoma and was an associate attorney with the Washington, D.C. law firm of Hogan and Hartson.

References

Sources
University of Tulsa College of Law Faculty Pages
TU Announces New Law Dean

 

Living people
Year of birth missing (living people)
University of Tulsa College of Law faculty
Deans of law schools in the United States
State treasurers of Oklahoma
Oklahoma Democrats
Jewish American people in Oklahoma politics
University of Pennsylvania Law School alumni
Yale College alumni
21st-century American Jews